"Ferrari" is a song by English DJ and producer James Hype and British singer Miggy Dela Rosa, released as a single through Island Records and the Cross on 15 March 2022. It samples "I Need a Girl (Part Two)" by P. Diddy and Ginuwine featuring Loon, Mario Winans, and Tammy Ruggieri (2002). The song charted across Europe and the UK, reaching number one on the Belgian Ultratop 50 and Dutch Single Top 100.

Reception
Radio Kiss Kiss found the song to carry James Hype's "signature bass lines" with a "perfect" vocal by Miggy Dela Rosa in its chorus, all "for what sounds like a summer anthem".

Charts

Weekly charts

Monthly charts

Year-end charts

Certifications

References

2022 singles
2022 songs
Island Records singles
James Hype songs
Songs written by Adonis Shropshire
Songs written by Loon (rapper)
Songs written by Mario Winans
Songs written by Sean Combs
Song recordings produced by James Hype
Ultratop 50 Singles (Flanders) number-one singles